Sawans-Mianwali is a village and Union Council of Mianwali District in the Punjab Province of Pakistan 44000.  Its Postal Code is 42301.

The first tribes came to the area more than in the early first century AD. Historical coins, weapons and other artifacts have been found in the village in different times. Sawans is a unique name in the whole region and its history is as under;

The locals said that Sheer shah Soori came from this Door. And this door(Darrah) is known as door of mountain (Darra e Sawans). 
Basically this a natural area consisting of green fields and water streams. This area is beside Moosa Khel Mountains, so in old ages robbers use this village for their shelter. Now this area is very developed.

Mostly niazi family lives here. The chairman of this UC is Mr. Tariq khan niazi. Mr. Ameer abdullah khan is a great Army JCO officer of this small village.

The Union Council is an administrative Subdivision of Mianwali Tehsil.

Populated places in Mianwali District